Isocoma gypsophila is a Mexican plant species in the family Asteraceae. It has been found in the States of Zacatecas and Nuevo León.

Isocoma gypsophila is a small perennial herb up to 10 cm (4 inches) tall, the stems mostly reclining on the ground and forming a mat. The plant produces one or two flower heads on the tips of branches, each head containing 30-40 disc flowers but no ray flowers.

References

External links
photo of herbarium specimen at the University of Texas, collected in Nuevo León in 1995

gypsophila
Endemic flora of Mexico
Flora of Nuevo León
Flora of Zacatecas
Plants described in 1972